Joseph Taylor was an English professional rugby league footballer who played as a forward in the 1900s and 1910s. 

He played at club level for Wakefield Trinity (Heritage № 153) during the era of contested scrums.

Playing career

County honours
Joseph Taylor won cap(s) for Yorkshire while at Wakefield Trinity, including against New Zealand at Belle Vue, Wakefield on Wednesday 18 December 1907.

Challenge Cup Final appearances
Joseph Taylor played as a forward, i.e. number 10, in Wakefield Trinity's 17-0 victory over Hull F.C. in the 1909 Challenge Cup Final during the 1908–09 season at Headingley Rugby Stadium, Leeds on Tuesday 20 April 1909, in front of a crowd of 23,587.

County Cup Final appearances
Joseph Taylor played as a forward, i.e. number, in Wakefield Trinity's 8-2 victory over Huddersfield in the 1910 Yorkshire County Cup Final during the 1910–11 season at Headingley Rugby Stadium, Leeds on Saturday 3 December 1910.

Club career
Joseph Taylor made his début for Wakefield Trinity during January 1906, he appears to have scored no drop-goals (or field-goals as they are currently known in Australasia), but prior to the 1974–75 season all goals, whether; conversions, penalties, or drop-goals, scored 2-points, consequently prior to this date drop-goals were often not explicitly documented, therefore '0' drop-goals may indicate drop-goals not recorded, rather than no drop-goals scored. In addition, prior to the 1949–50 season, the archaic field-goal was also still a valid means of scoring points.

Novelty Race
On Saturday 23 March 1907, Joseph Taylor on his début, took part in a mile foot race for £100 prize money against Oliver Littlewood, of Outwood, the veteran amateur long distance runner. 2,287 people paid for admission with receipts of £54 12s 2d (based on increases in average earnings, this would be approximately £20,390 in 2016). Littlewood started the race bandaged and was to retire after 3/4 of a mile, leaving Taylor untested, as he finished alone amidst great excitement and cheering.

References

External links
Search for "Taylor" at rugbyleagueproject.org

English rugby league players
Place of birth missing
Place of death missing
Rugby league forwards
Rugby league players from Wakefield
Wakefield Trinity players
Year of birth missing
Year of death missing
Yorkshire rugby league team players